Gábor Török may refer to:
 Gábor Török (footballer) (1936–2004), Hungarian football goalkeeper
 Gábor Török (political scientist) (born 1971), Hungarian political scientist and historian